The Haunted is a Swedish heavy metal band from Gothenburg, formed in 1996. The original members were Anders and Jonas Björler, Peter Dolving, Adrian Erlandsson and Patrik Jensen. Both of the Björler brothers and Erlandsson were members of the seminal melodic death metal band At the Gates, a pioneering force in the Swedish death metal scene.

History

Formation and The Haunted; first Dolving-era (1996–1999)
On 27 July 1996, Patrik Jensen co-created the band with Adrian Erlandsson, who had just become an ex-member of his former band, At the Gates, due to the band's split the day before. They had made their demo, called Demo '97, in 1997.

The band were signed to Earache Records and subsequently released their first album, the self-titled debut The Haunted in 1998. The album resulted in The Haunted being praised as Newcomer of the Year by several magazines, and the album being called Album of the Year by Terrorizer Magazine. The Haunted made a respectable live reputation staging the Swedish metal scene, as well the international scene, touring the UK with Napalm Death.

After the release of this album, Peter Dolving and Adrian Erlandsson both left the band in 1999, the former focusing on a solo career and the latter joining Cradle of Filth. Their replacements were Marco Aro and Per Möller Jensen. The band began to record their second album shortly afterwards.

Made Me Do It and One Kill Wonder; first Aro-era (2000–2003)
Their second album, Made Me Do It, released in 2000, was more melodic and resembled the Gothenburg style (with bands such as At the Gates, etc.) more than old-school thrash metal that was used on The Haunted. It is originally called Made Me Do It, but the idea is for the band name to be included in the title. "The Haunted Made Me Do It" topped CMJ Loud Rock Radio Chart for four weeks, and won a Swedish Grammy for Best Hard Rock Album. The album was followed by European tours with Entombed and Nile, The Crown in the UK, and In Flames in Japan. The Haunted played festivals such as 2000 Decibel, Hultsfred (both in Sweden), Graspop (Belgium), and Wacken Open Air (Germany). The band subsequently released their first live album - Live Rounds in Tokyo.

In August 2001, guitarist/songwriter Anders Björler left the band and he was temporarily replaced by Marcus Sunesson of The Crown for The Haunted's headlining tour; in less than a year Björler returned to the band. This meant that he could appear on the third studio album.

The next album was released in February 2003 and was titled One Kill Wonder. The Haunted broke their own record being listed at number one on CMJ Loud Rock Radio Chart in five weeks. Alternative Press hailed The Haunted as one of metal's 25 most important bands. The song D.O.A., from this album, became available for download in March 2008 for the video game Rock Band, on the Xbox 360's Xbox Live Marketplace, and the PlayStation 3's PlayStation Network. Another song from the same album, Shadow World, was announced as a future download.

Revolver; second Dolving-era (2003–2005)
One Kill Wonder resulted in the band dominating album charts all over the world, and their first tours to Australia and South Africa, another tour to Japan, and a second Grammy. After another tour to Scandinavia, North America, United Kingdom and Europe in late 2003, the sudden departure of Marco Aro came as a shock. Though, this opened a new chance of building up a reunion with former vocalist Peter Dolving.

Their first album with Peter Dolving back at the helm (and signed to a new deal with Century Media), was entitled Revolver. The new album was released in October 2004 and the name was to convey the evolution of the band and the music it now played as a whole. Revolver was met with a fair amount of fan support and critical acclaim, and the band toured the world extensively in support of it, including a second stage spot at Ozzfest 2005. On 2 February 2005, Marco Aro played his last show in Stockholm, Sweden but as a guest singer. In 2006, the band performed on the Extreme The Dojo vol.15 tour in Japan with Exodus and Nile, while Edge of Spirit opened for them.

The Dead Eye and Versus (2006–2009)

The Haunted's fifth studio album, The Dead Eye, was released on 30 October 2006 in Europe and was again a success, showing a more sinister side to Dolving's lyrics and a more technical, haunting musical approach. It was released in the US on 31 October 2006. They later toured Europe and toured with Dark Tranquillity, Into Eternity, and Scar Symmetry for the North America Metal For The Masses tour. They later toured Europe for the Cursed Earth tour with bands like Wolf, Municipal Waste, and Lyzanxia before taking a break in order to later return to play further tours and some shows in Russia.

Their sixth studio album, Versus, was released on 17 September 2008 in Sweden, 19–24 September in the rest of Europe, and 14 October in the US. In 2009 the band released a compilation album Warning Shots. In April 2010, the band released a live CD called Road Kill, and they supported heavy metal legends Slayer on their August 2010 tour. The band was also confirmed as being part of the soundtrack for Namco Bandai Games' 2010 remake of Splatterhouse.

Unseen, going on hiatus (2010–2012)
In April 2010, Dolving revealed that they had started writing new material, and the recording of a seventh album started that same fall. On 30 December, the band announced that the upcoming album was to be called Unseen and was to be released in March 2011.

The first sneak preview of the album was on 22 January 2011, when the band performed the song "No Ghost" on the P3 Guld Gala, broadcast live on TV and radio throughout Sweden.

However, on 29 February 2012, Peter Dolving quit the band for the second time. On 1 March 2012, The Haunted announced vocalist auditions via their Facebook page:

On 16 October 2012 two more members of the band, guitarist Anders Björler and drummer Per Möller Jensen also quit, leaving the band's future up in the air. Jonas announced on the band's Facebook that both he and Patrik were still deeply committed to the band, but acknowledged that now two additional band members had left, they were naturally uncertain of the band's future. Unsurprisingly, a hiatus followed this turbulent series of events, and fans waited nervously to see what would transpire.

Exit Wounds; second Aro-era (2014–2016)

Patrik Jensen and Jonas Björler had a discussion at Jonas' 40th birthday party about not letting The Haunted disband. When Jensen asked Björler who should be the new vocalist in the band, Björler could only think of former member, Marco Aro. A few days later Jensen phoned Aro asking him to rejoin The Haunted. Aro had missed being in the band and was tempted to rejoin, but he was hesitant at first because he was not interested in returning to the hectic touring he had done with The Haunted in his past stint as vocalist. The Haunted had done a lot of touring for almost a decade straight after Aro left, reducing the band's desire to continue with such scheduling going forward. More hesitation came because Aro had struggled with drug addiction during his time with the band, causing problems with his family, which he didn't want to risk a reoccurrence of. He indicated that he needed to discuss rejoining the band with his family.
Aro was also in the band The Resistance and didn't want to have conflicting schedules with both bands, so he had to have a discussion with The Resistance as well. Aro told Jensen he'd give him a response two weeks later. By then, the band had shown him the a breakdown of future tours, which encouraged Aro to rejoin The Haunted. Before publicly revealing information of the band's new lineup, Aro stated only that there was "good news coming from the band". His picture was in a silhouette on the band's official Facebook the day before the band announced a new line-up. 

Original drummer Adrian Erlandsson now returned to the band also, and Ola Englund from Six Feet Under was brought in as the band's new lead guitarist. The band then began writing for an EP titled Eye of the Storm, which was released on 20 January 2014 in Europe and 21 January 2014 in North America. The band had already been rehearsing before the announcement of the new lineup, and their first live performance followed at the 70000 Tons of Metal which set sail 27–31 January 2014.

On 1 July 2014, it was announced that their new album would be titled Exit Wounds, with the release date of 25 August 2014 in Europe and 2 September 2014 in North America. The track listing and the album cover were revealed on the same day.

Strength in Numbers (2017–2021)
On 10 May 2017, Century Media Records announced the band's ninth studio album would be entitled Strength in Numbers and it was subsequently released worldwide on 25 August 2017.

New album in progress (2022)
On 7 August 2022, Ola announced on his Youtube channel that The Haunted were preparing to write a new album.

Band members

Current members
 Patrik Jensen – rhythm guitar 
 Jonas Björler – bass 
 Adrian Erlandsson – drums 
 Marco Aro – vocals 
 Ola Englund – lead guitar 

Former members
 Peter Dolving – vocals 
 John Zwetsloot – lead guitar 
 Anders Björler – lead guitar 
 Marcus Sunesson – lead guitar 
 Per Möller Jensen – drums

Timeline

Discography

 The Haunted (1998)
 Made Me Do It (2000)
 One Kill Wonder (2003)
 Revolver (2004)
 The Dead Eye (2006)
 Versus (2008)
 Unseen (2011)
 Exit Wounds (2014)
 Strength in Numbers (2017)

References

External links

 
1996 establishments in Sweden
Century Media Records artists
Earache Records artists
Heavy metal supergroups
Musical groups established in 1996
Musical groups from Gothenburg
Swedish melodic death metal musical groups
Swedish thrash metal musical groups
Sibling musical groups